Euphoria inda, the bumble flower beetle, brown fruit chafer or Indian cetonia is a species of beetle in the family Scarabaeidae. It is found in North America.  While in flight, adults of this species do not lift their elytra, creating a buzzing sound as the hindwings vibrate inside.  The adult beetle is a pollinator and feeds on pollen, nectar, sap and damaged fruits.

References

Further reading

External links

 

Cetoniinae
Articles created by Qbugbot
Beetles described in 1758
Taxa named by Carl Linnaeus